Mehmet Şimşek (born 1 January 1967) is a Turkish politician and economist who served as a Deputy Prime Minister of Turkey from 24 November 2015 until the office's abolition on 9 July 2018. He previously served as the Minister of Finance from 2009 to 2015, serving in the cabinets of Prime Ministers of Recep Tayyip Erdoğan and Ahmet Davutoğlu. As a member of the Justice and Development Party, he was elected as a Member of Parliament for Gaziantep in the 2007 general election and for Batman in the 2011 general election.

In Prime Minister Erdoğan's second cabinet (2007-2011), Şimşek became a Minister of State responsible for the economy upon his election as an MP. In 2009, he became the Minister of Finance. He retained his position in Erdoğan's third cabinet and the first cabinet of Ahmet Davutoğlu, who took over as Prime Minister in 2014.

As Finance Minister, Şimşek formulated fiscal policy which helped Turkey recover strongly from the global financial crisis of 2008. He also undertook far reaching reforms founding the Tax Audit Board, simplifying tax regulations, enhancing taxpayers’ rights, and reducing the shadow economy.

Early life education
Şimşek was born to a Kurdish family in 1967, in a small village in Batman, a province in Southeastern Turkey.  Şimşek earned his B.Sc. in Economics from Ankara University in 1988. After working as research assistant in the chair of international economics and economic development, he was awarded a state scholarship to the University of Exeter in the United Kingdom, where he earned his M.Phil. in Finance and Investments in 1993.

Şimşek previously worked as the chief economist and strategist for the emerging Europe, Middle East and Africa region at Merrill Lynch in London for 7 years. At this time he had a number of contacts with the Turkish authorities and the Central Bank and had worked with the AKP government on economic policy. He also served as senior economist and bank analyst for Deutsche-Bender Securities from 1998 to 2000. Şimşek spent about a year in New York City where he worked for UBS Securities in 1997. Prior to that, he was a senior economist at the US Embassy in Ankara for almost four years.

Political career

Elected as an AKP Member of Parliament for Gaziantep in the 2007 general election, Şimşek began his ministerial career as a Minister of State and was promoted to the post of Finance Minister in 2009.

He was nominated as one of the 500 most powerful people on the planet by Foreign Policy in 2013 and also awarded the title of "Finance Minister of the Year for Emerging Europe 2013" by Emerging Markets magazine.

2014 economic slowdown
Turkey experienced a reduction in economic growth in 2014, blamed by the government mainly on the problems in the Eurozone, with much of it allegedly due to political uncertainty in the country. By March 2015, the Turkish lira began losing heavy value towards the US dollar, trading at ₺2.68 to US$1. The sudden decline caused the Central Bank of Turkey to make a written intervention, with the opposition criticising President Recep Tayyip Erdoğan for intervening in economic affairs despite his neutral and ceremonial role. The economy was seen as so fragile due to the political uncertainty that a single speech by Erdoğan caused the lira to rapidly lose its value against the dollar soon after. Investors were also concerned about the future of Deputy Prime Minister Ali Babacan, who holds responsibility for the Economy.

Despite the economic slowdown, Şimşek claimed that there would be a high chance that the lira would regain its value and that inflation would fall at a fast rate in 2016. With key Islamists in government, such as Numan Kurtulmuş, openly critical about the independence of the Central Bank, Şimşek claimed that the uncertainty caused by the potential of politicising the Central Bank meant that Turkey was unlikely to return to strong economic growth in the near future.

Şimşek has since defended his record as Finance Minister, stating that his government was being unfairly targeted despite managing to keep its budget commitments under heavy economic pressures.

Poverty reduction
In May 2015, Şimşek was ridiculed for tweeting that his government had reduced poverty, as well as including a statistic that showed that the percentage of the population living below $1 a day fell from 0.2% to 0% between 2002 and 2013. The tweet generated huge controversy, with replies asking whether his Twitter account had been hacked.

June 2015 general election

In the run-up to the June 2015 general election, Şimşek stated that populism by opposition parties would be the most significant threat to Turkey's economy, stating that the Republican People's Party's policy of increasing the minimum wage to ₺1,500 would be devastating to workers, alleging that the extra cost of hiring workers would lead to unemployment. Commenting on other policies in the Republican People's Party (CHP) manifesto, Şimşek claimed that if the party could name a source for all their spending plans, he would vote for them. The CHP subsequently gave the numerous government corruption scandals, the lavish spending on a new Presidential Palace and government waste as their funding.

In the run up to the election, Şimşek ordered the release of ₺1.325 billion of allowances to farmers and manufacturers.

After the 2018 election, Şimşek was replaced by Erdogan with Erdogan's son in law Berat Albayrak in July 2018.

Hacking
In 2019, it was revealed that Şimşek had been targeted by Project Raven; a UAE clandestine  surveillance and hacking operation, targeting other governments, militants and human rights activists critical of the UAE monarchy. Using a "sophisticated spying tool called Karma" they managed to hack an  iPhone belonging to Şimşek.

Personal life 
Minister Şimşek is married and has twin girls. In addition to Turkish, he speaks Kurdish and English fluently and has both British and Turkish citizenships.

See also
Ali Babacan
Nihat Zeybekci

References

External links
 Official website
 https://twitter.com/memetsimsek

|-

1967 births
Ankara University alumni
Deputy Prime Ministers of Turkey
Justice and Development Party (Turkey) politicians
Living people
Members of the 23rd Parliament of Turkey
Members of the 24th Parliament of Turkey
Members of the 25th Parliament of Turkey
Members of the 26th Parliament of Turkey
Members of the 63rd government of Turkey
Members of the 64th government of Turkey
Members of the 65th government of Turkey
Merrill (company) people
Ministers of Finance of Turkey
People from Batman, Turkey
Turkish Kurdish politicians
Members of the 60th government of Turkey